The name Beatriz has been used for seven tropical cyclones in the Eastern Pacific Ocean.
 Hurricane Beatriz (1981), remained far from land
 Tropical Storm Beatriz (1987), formed far from land
 Tropical Storm Beatriz (1993), made landfall in Mexico, killing six
 Hurricane Beatriz (1999), a Category 3 hurricane, possibly became annular
 Tropical Storm Beatriz (2005), never threatened land
 Hurricane Beatriz (2011), a Category 1 hurricane that grazed Mexico and killed four
 Tropical Storm Beatriz (2017), made landfall in Mexico, killing seven

Pacific hurricane set index articles